is a railway station on the Yamada Line in the city of Miyako, Iwate, Japan, operated by East Japan Railway Company (JR East).

Lines
Kuzakai Station is served by the Yamada Line, and is located 35.6 kilometers from the terminus of the line at Morioka Station.

Station layout
Kuzakai Station has two opposed side platforms connected to the station building by a level crossing. The station is staffed.

Platforms

History
Kuzakai Station opened on 25 September 1928. The station was absorbed into the JR East network upon the privatization of the Japanese National Railways (JNR) on 1 April 1987.

Passenger statistics
In fiscal 2015, the station was used by an average of 1 passenger daily (boarding passengers only).

Surrounding area
  National Route 106

Climate

See also
 List of railway stations in Japan

References

External links

  

Railway stations in Iwate Prefecture
Yamada Line (JR East)
Railway stations in Japan opened in 1928
Miyako, Iwate
Stations of East Japan Railway Company